João Jorge Constantino (born June 28, 1936) is a Brazilian former football player.

Career 
He played with Sociedade Esportiva Palmeiras. Jorge played abroad with Montreal Concordia in 1961 in a split season in the International Soccer League and National Soccer League. He assisted Montreal in securing the Dominion Cup after defeating the Vancouver Firefighters. The following season he played in La Liga with Real Oviedo.

References 

1936 births
Living people
Brazilian footballers
Sociedade Esportiva Palmeiras players
Montreal Concordia players
Real Oviedo players
International Soccer League players
Canadian National Soccer League players
La Liga players
Association football forwards
Footballers from São Paulo